Tripura National Volunteers (also Tribal National Volunteers or Tripura National Volunteer Force) was a Tripuri nationalist militant group in the Tripura region of India that launched an armed struggle in the early 1980s to separate Tripura from India. TNV was led by Bijoy Kumar Hrangkhawl.

Christians made up a large percent of the fighters and leaders of the TNV. The chairman, Bijoy Hrangkhawl, was a devout Christian. Tribesmen who were not Christian who joined the TNV were encouraged to convert to Christianity.

TNV surrendered in 1988 and integrated themselves into a political party. In 2000, TNV renamed itself as Indigenous Nationalist Party of Twipra.

In 2001, TNV merged with Indigenous People's Front of Tripura.

History
The TNV was founded in 1978 with assistance from the Mizo National Front. It was initially called the Tribal National Volunteers.

See also
Tripuri nationalism
Tripura rebellion
All Tripura Tiger Force

References

Tripuri nationalism
Defunct political parties in Tripura
1978 establishments in Tripura
Political parties established in 1978
Political parties disestablished in 2000
Rebel groups in India
Indigenous People's Front of Tripura